Montserrado-9 is an electoral district for the elections to the House of Representatives of Liberia. The district covers the Monrovia communities of ICA Camp, Pyne People, Fiama, Fiama East, Fish Market, Gbangaye Town, Wroto Town, Raymond Field, Central Lakpazee, Old Matadi and New Matadi, as well as the eastern parts of Cooper Clinic and Ocean View communities. The 12th Street constitutes the boundary between Montserrado-8.

Elected representatives

References

Electoral districts in Liberia